Mitchell Jenkins (January 24, 1896 – September 15, 1977) was a U.S. Republican Congressional Representative from Pennsylvania.

Biography
Mitchell Jenkins was born in Forty Fort, Luzerne County, Pennsylvania. He attended the Kingston, Pennsylvania public elementary schools and the Wyoming Seminary Upper School during his high school years. He graduated from Wesleyan University in Middletown, Connecticut in June 1919 and the New York University School of Law in New York City in June 1923.

Jenkins was admitted to the New York Bar in December 1923 and the Pennsylvania Bar in January 1924 and commenced practice in Wilkes-Barre, Pennsylvania. He served as assistant district attorney of Luzerne County from 1938 to 1946.

In April 1917, Jenkins enlisted as a private in the United States Army and was discharged as a first lieutenant on January 2, 1919. He enlisted in the Pennsylvania National Guard as a private in January 1926 and rose through the ranks to lieutenant colonel prior to induction into Federal service on February 17, 1941. He served four and a half years during the Second World War, during which time he was promoted to colonel, and was placed on inactive status on October 5, 1945. He was promoted to brigadier general (retired) in the Pennsylvania National Guard.

Jenkins was elected as a Republican to the Eightieth Congress (January 3, 1947–January 3, 1949) and was not a candidate for reelection in 1948 to the Eighty-first Congress. He once again served as the assistant district attorney of Luzerne County in 1949, and again in 1950. Thereafter he resumed his private law practice in Wilkes-Barre, where he died, aged 81. He was interred in Evergreen Cemetery in Shavertown, Pennsylvania.

References

The Political Graveyard

External links

1896 births
1977 deaths
United States Army personnel of World War II
New York University School of Law alumni
Pennsylvania lawyers
People from the Scranton–Wilkes-Barre metropolitan area
United States Army officers
Wesleyan University alumni
Republican Party members of the United States House of Representatives from Pennsylvania
20th-century American politicians
Wyoming Seminary alumni
20th-century American lawyers